The River Erriff is a river in Ireland, flowing through County Mayo. A spate river, it is characterised by lively streams and deep fish-holding pools. A waterfall called Aasleagh Falls is near the mouth of the river.

Course
The River Erriff forms from the union of the Owenree River and Owenmore River in Glennacally. It flows west-southwest parallel to the N59, passing under Aasleagh Bridge and entering Killary Harbour.

Wildlife

The River Erriff is a noted salmon and trout fishery.

References

See also
 Rivers of Ireland

Erriff